Änglar och en massa kärlek is a studio album by Arvingarna, released on the Sony Music label on 18 December 2013, consisting of a 2013 Beach party of the 2012 single "Semester". In 2014, the album was awarded a Guldklaven Award in the "Best album of the year" category.

Track listing

Contributors
Violin: Mattias Johansson
Cello: David Bukovinszky
String programming: Mattias Bylund
Drums: Anders Hedlund
Electric bass and acoustic guitar: Figge Boström
Trumpet: Stefan Persson
Saxophone: Wojtex Goral

Charts

References 

2013 albums
Arvingarna albums